Mšeno is a town in Mělník District the Central Bohemian Region of the Czech Republic. It has about 1,400 inhabitants. The town centre is well preserved and is protected by law as an urban monument zone.

Administrative parts
Villages of Brusné 2.díl, Hradsko, Olešno, Ráj, Romanov, Sedlec, Skramouš and Vojtěchov are administrative parts of Mšeno.

Etymology
The name is derived from the Czech word mech, i.e. "moss".

Geography
It lies on the border between the Jizera Table and Ralsko Uplands. A large part of the municipal territory lies in the Kokořínsko – Máchův kraj Protected Landscape Area.

History
The Slavic people settled the town area probably in the 5th–6th centuries. The first written mention of Mšeno is from 1306, in a document signed by Wenceslaus III awarding the then-village to aristocrat Hynek of Dubá. He, and his son after him, ensured the growing prosperity of the area. In 1367, Charles IV promoted Mšeno to a town.

During the Thirty Years' War the town suffered, but in the 17th and 18th centuries, the town prospered and the population grew. In 1879, the railroad was built, and in 1901, the school was opened.

Demographics

Sights

A valuable and numerous set of two-storey timbered and half-timbered small-town architecture is typical for the outskirts of the town. Most of the older buildings on the square disappeared during a large fire in 1867. The current appearance of the main urban spaces is determined by the late Neoclassical and eclectic buildings.

In 1842, the town hall was built, then it was rebuilt and raised in the neo-Gothic style in 1864.

The predecessor of today's parish church was allegedly the Romanesque Church of Saint Wenceslaus. In 1876–1879, the Church of Saint Martin was built. It has a high tower and it is the main urban and landscape landmark.

Notable people
Wojciech Żywny (1756–1842), Czech-Polish pianist
Anna Bayerová (1853–1924), physician

References

External links

Cities and towns in the Czech Republic